Johnson O. Amoah (born 15 August 1940) is a Ghanaian athlete. He competed in the men's triple jump at the 1968 Summer Olympics and the 1972 Summer Olympics.

References

External links

1940 births
Living people
Athletes (track and field) at the 1966 British Empire and Commonwealth Games
Athletes (track and field) at the 1968 Summer Olympics
Athletes (track and field) at the 1970 British Commonwealth Games
Athletes (track and field) at the 1972 Summer Olympics
Athletes (track and field) at the 1974 British Commonwealth Games
Ghanaian male triple jumpers
Olympic athletes of Ghana
Commonwealth Games competitors for Ghana